A list of films produced in the Soviet Union in 1923 (see 1923 in film).

1923

See also
 1923 in the Soviet Union

External links
 Soviet films of 1923 at the Internet Movie Database

1923
Soviet
Films